Dog Days is a 2018  American romantic comedy film directed by Ken Marino and written by Elissa Matsueda and Erica Oyama. It stars Eva Longoria, Nina Dobrev, Vanessa Hudgens, Lauren Lapkus, Thomas Lennon, Adam Pally, Ryan Hansen, Rob Corddry, Tone Bell, Jon Bass and Finn Wolfhard. The plot follows the intertwining lives of various dogs and their owners around Los Angeles.

The movie was released on August 8, 2018, by LD Entertainment, and received mixed reviews from critics.

Plot
Los Angeles, California, is the main and heart-warming scenario where life and fate interconnect five different stories as well as their characters with their respective canine pets: Elizabeth is a famous newscaster of a morning TV show; after a disastrous interview with former football player Jimmy, Elizabeth's boss decides to contract Jimmy as co-host due to the high ratings of the interview. In another part of the city, Tara, a barista at a coffee shop who passes her days talking with her shallow, dog-walker friend Daisy. Tara, who is crazy about the friendly but full of himself vet Dr. Mike, one day meets Garrett, the eccentric and shy owner of an animal care center who is unable to tell Tara that he loves her. Grace and Kurt are a married couple struggling to properly prepare for their adoptive daughter, Amelia, to arrive. When she moves in, she doesn't seem happy with her new home and her new parents. Dax is a teen in the body of adult, and leader of the aspiring rock band Frunk, who after a visit to his pregnant sister Ruth and her husband Greg, is forced to take care of Ruth's dog, despite his building not allowing dogs. Finally Walter, an aging, lonely widower, loses his dog when it escapes and runs off. Tyler, his regular pizza delivery driver unexpectedly offers to help find her. As time moves on, things become more complicated: Elizabeth and Jimmy start to feel attracted to each other, making their work more difficult. After they've been dating for some time, Elizabeth finds out (from her makeup artist) that Jimmy has been offered a position hosting a show on another channel. Tara accepts Garrett’s offer to work as volunteer in his animal care center at the same time she starts to date Dr. Mike; meanwhile Garrett learns that the owner of the building has sold it and he'll lose the center. Amelia finds Walter's dog, which makes her happy, but Grace and Kurt fear that one day Amelia will lose her new friend if the owner appears; Dax is caring for Ruth's dog, although eventually it starts to put order in his life, even as it creates trouble to hide it from his neighbors. Walter begins helping Tyler with his academic studies in exchange for help finding his dog. Jimmy's has to put his dog Brandy down after she suffers a stroke. After hearing the news Elizabeth realizes she loves Jimmy and wants to be with him. Tara works to help Garrett save his animal shelter by organizing a fund-raiser with live music, which culminates in all the main characters' fates intertwining in unexpected ways.

Cast
 Vanessa Hudgens as Tara, a barista
 Michael Cassidy as Mike, a veterinarian
 Jon Bass as Garrett, who runs a dog shelter
 Nina Dobrev as Elizabeth, who hosts a morning show
 Tone Bell as Jimmy, an athlete
 Adam Pally as Dax, a musician
 Jessica St. Clair as Ruth, Dax's pregnant sister
 Thomas Lennon as Greg, Ruth's husband
 Ron Cephas Jones as Walter, a widower
 Finn Wolfhard as Tyler, a pizza delivery boy
 Eva Longoria as Grace, who is adopting a daughter
 Rob Corddry as Kurt, Grace's husband
 Elizabeth Caro as Amelia, who is adopted by Grace and Kurt
 Lauren Lapkus as Daisy, a dog-walker
 John Gemberling as Ernie, Mike's assistant
 Jessica Lowe as Amy, the makeup girl at Elizabeth's show
 Phoebe Neidhardt as Alexa, a weather girl
 Toks Olagundoye as Nina, Elizabeth's boss
 Tig Notaro as Danielle, a dog therapist
 David Wain as Wacky Wayne, a clown
 Ryan Hansen as Peter, Elizabeth's boyfriend
 Jasmine Cephas Jones as Lola, a singer in Dax's band
 Tony Cavalero as Stanley, a drummer in Dax's band

Production
In August 2017, it was announced Ken Marino would direct the film, from a screenplay by Elissa Matsueda and Erica Oyama, with Mickey Liddell, Jennifer Monroe and Pete Shilaimon producing under their LD Entertainment banner. In September 2017, Finn Wolfhard, Vanessa Hudgens, Tone Bell, Adam Pally, Eva Longoria, and Jon Bass joined the cast of the film. In October 2017, Tig Notaro, Rob Corddry, Michael Cassidy, Jasmine Cephas Jones, Ron Cephas Jones, John Gemberling, Ryan Hansen, Thomas Lennon, Lauren Lapkus, Jessica Lowe, Toks Olagundoye, Jessica St. Clair and David Wain joined the cast of the film.

Filming
Principal photography began in October 2017, in Los Angeles, California.

Release
The film was released on August 8, 2018 by LD Entertainment.

Reception

Box office
In the United States and Canada, Dog Days was projected to gross $5–9 million from 2,442 theaters over its five-day opening weekend. The film made $635,164 on its opening day, a Wednesday, and another $405,000 on its second for a two-day total of $1 million. It went on to have an opening weekend of $2.6 million, for a five-day debut of just $3.6 million. In its second weekend of release, the film was removed from 55 theaters across the country, dropping 66% and grossing $868,664.

Critical response
On review aggregation website Rotten Tomatoes, the film holds an approval rating of  based on  reviews. The website's critical consensus reads, "Dog Days is frivolous but frothy, sporting a forgettable cast of human characters but a lovable troupe of pooches that ought to delight viewers looking for a gentle affirmation of humanity's bond with their furry friends." On Metacritic, the film has a weighted average score of 47 out of 100, based on reviews from 19 critics, indicating "mixed or average reviews". Audiences polled by CinemaScore gave the film an average grade of "A−" on an A+ to F scale.

References

External links
 

2018 films
American drama films
Films shot in Los Angeles
Films about dogs
Films about pets
LD Entertainment films
2010s English-language films
2010s American films